Jeremy Charles Robert Clarkson (born 11 April 1960) is an English broadcaster, journalist, game show host and writer who specialises in motoring. He is best known for the motoring programmes Top Gear and The Grand Tour alongside Richard Hammond and James May. He also currently writes weekly columns for The Sunday Times and The Sun. Since 2018, Clarkson has hosted the  ITV game show Who Wants to Be a Millionaire?.

From a career as a local journalist in northern England, Clarkson rose to public prominence as a presenter of the original format of Top Gear in 1988. Since the mid-1990s, he has become a recognised public personality, regularly appearing on British television presenting his own shows for BBC and appearing as a guest on other shows. As well as motoring, Clarkson has produced programmes and books on subjects such as history and engineering. In 1998, he hosted the first series of Robot Wars, and from 1998 to 2000 he also hosted his own talk show, Clarkson.

In 2015, the BBC elected not to renew Clarkson's contract after he assaulted a Top Gear producer while filming on location. That year, Clarkson and his Top Gear co-presenters and producer Andy Wilman formed the production company W. Chump & Sons to produce The Grand Tour for Amazon Prime Video.

Clarkson's opinionated but humorous tongue-in-cheek writing and presenting style has often provoked a public reaction. His actions, both privately and as a Top Gear presenter, have also sometimes resulted in criticism from the media, politicians, pressure groups and the public. He also has a significant public following, being credited as a major factor in the resurgence of Top Gear as one of the most popular shows on the BBC.

Early life

Childhood
Clarkson was born in Doncaster, West Riding of Yorkshire, the son of Shirley Gabrielle Clarkson (1934–2014), a teacher, and Edward Grenville Clarkson (1932–1994), a travelling salesman. His parents, who ran a business selling tea cosies, put their son's name down in advance for private schools, with no idea how they were going to pay the fees. However, shortly before his admission, when he was 13, his parents made two Paddington Bear stuffed toys for Clarkson and his sister Joanna. These proved so popular that they started selling them through the business. Because they were manufacturing and selling the bears without regard to intellectual property rights, upon his becoming aware of the bears Michael Bond took action through his solicitors. Edward Clarkson travelled to London to meet Bond's lawyer. By coincidence, he met Bond in the lift, and the two struck up an immediate rapport. Consequently, Bond awarded the Clarksons the licensing of the bear rights throughout the world, with the family eventually selling to Britain's then leading toystore, Hamleys. The income from this success enabled the Clarksons to be able to pay the fees for Jeremy to attend Hill House School, Doncaster, and later Repton School.

Repton School
Clarkson has stated he was deeply unhappy at Repton School, saying that he had been a "suicidal wreck" there, having experienced extreme bullying. He alleged that:
I suffered many terrible things. I was thrown on an hourly basis into the ice plunge pool, dragged from my bed in the middle of the night and beaten, made to lick the lavatories clean and all the usual humiliations that... turn a small boy into a gibbering, sobbing, suicidal wreck... they glued my records together, snapped my compass, ate my biscuits, defecated in my tuck box and they cut my trousers in half.

According to his own account, he was expelled from Repton School for "drinking, smoking and generally making a nuisance of himself." He famously left with one C and two U (fail) grades at A level. Clarkson attended Repton alongside Formula One engineer Adrian Newey and former Top Gear Executive Producer Andy Wilman.

He played the role of a preparatory school pupil, Atkinson, in a BBC radio Children's Hour serial adaptation of Anthony Buckeridge's Jennings novels until his voice broke.

Career

Writing career
Clarkson's first job was as a travelling salesman for his parents' business, selling Paddington Bear toys.
He later trained as a journalist with the Rotherham Advertiser, before also writing for the Rochdale Observer, Wolverhampton Express and Star, Lincolnshire Life, Shropshire Star and the Associated Kent Newspapers.

When writing in 2015 in his final column for Top Gear magazine, he credited the Shropshire Star as his first outlet as a motoring columnist: "I started small, on the Shropshire Star with little Peugeots and Fiats and worked my way up to Ford Granadas and Rovers until, after about seven years, I was allowed to drive an Aston Martin Lagonda... It was 10 years before I drove my first Lamborghini."

In 1984, Clarkson formed the Motoring Press Agency (MPA), in which, with fellow motoring journalist Jonathan Gill, he conducted road tests for local newspapers and automotive magazines. This developed into articles for publications such as Performance Car. He has regularly written for Top Gear magazine since its launch in 1993.

In 1987, Clarkson wrote for Amstrad Computer User and compiled Amstrad CPC game reviews.

Clarkson writes regular columns in the tabloid newspaper The Sun, and for the broadsheet newspaper The Sunday Times. His columns in the Times are republished in The Weekend Australian newspaper. He also writes for the "Wheels" section of the Toronto Star. He has written humorous books about cars and several other subjects, with many of his books being collections of articles that he has written for The Sunday Times.

Television

Clarkson's first major television role came as one of the presenters on the British motoring programme Top Gear, from 27 October 1988 to 3 March 1999, in the programme's earlier format. Jon Bentley, a researcher at Top Gear, helped launch his television career. Bentley shortly afterwards became the show's producer, and said about hiring Clarkson: He was just what I was looking for – an enthusiastic motoring writer who could make cars on telly fun. He was opinionated and irreverent, rather than respectfully po-faced. The fact that he looked and sounded exactly like a twenty-something ex-public schoolboy didn't matter. Nor did the impression there was a hint of school bully about him. I knew he was the man for the job. [...] Clarkson stood out because he was funny. Even my bosses allowed themselves the odd titter.

Clarkson then also presented the show's new format from 20 October 2002 to 8 March 2015. Along with co-presenters James May and Richard Hammond, he is credited with turning Top Gear into the most-watched TV show on BBC Two, rebroadcast to over 100 countries around the world. Clarkson's company Bedder 6, which handled merchandise and international distribution for Top Gear, earned over £149m in revenue in 2012, prior to a restructuring that gave BBC Worldwide full control of the Top Gear rights.

Clarkson presented the first series UK version of Robot Wars. His talk show, Clarkson, comprised 27 half-hour episodes aired in the United Kingdom between November 1998 and December 2000, and featured guest interviews with musicians, politicians and television personalities. Clarkson went on to present documentaries focused on non-motoring themes such as history and engineering, although the motoring shows and videos continued. Alongside his stand-alone shows, many mirror the format of his newspaper columns and books, combining his love of driving and motoring journalism, with the examination and expression of his other views on the world, such as in Jeremy Clarkson's Motorworld, Jeremy Clarkson's Car Years and Jeremy Clarkson Meets the Neighbours.

After Trinny and Susannah labelled Clarkson's dress sense as that of a market trader, he was persuaded to appear on their fashion makeover show What Not to Wear to avoid being considered for their all-time worst dressed winner award. Their attempts at restyling Clarkson were rebuffed, and Clarkson stated he would rather eat his own hair than appear on the show again.

For an episode of the first series of the BBC's Who Do You Think You Are? broadcast in November 2004, Clarkson was invited to investigate his family history. It included the story of his great-great-great-grandfather, John Kilner (1792–1857), who invented the Kilner jar, a container for preserved fruit.

Clarkson's views are often showcased on television shows. In 1997, Clarkson appeared on the light-hearted comedy show Room 101, in which a guest nominates things they hate in life to be consigned to nothingness. Clarkson dispatched caravans, houseflies, the sitcom Last of the Summer Wine, the mentality within golf clubs, and vegetarians. He has made several appearances on the prime time talk shows Parkinson and Friday Night with Jonathan Ross since 2002. By 2003, his persona was deemed to fit the mould for the series Grumpy Old Men, in which middle-aged men talk about any aspects of modern life which irritate them. Since the topical news panel show Have I Got News for You dismissed regular host Angus Deayton in October 2002, Clarkson has become one of the most regularly used guest hosts on the show. Clarkson has appeared as a panellist on the political current affairs television show  Question Time twice since 2000. On 2 October 2015, he presented Have I Got News for You again for the first time since his dismissal.

Clarkson received a BAFTA nomination for Best Entertainment Performance in 2006. Jonathan Ross ended up winning the award. He won the National Television Awards Special Recognition Award in 2007, and reportedly earned £1 million that same year for his role as a Top Gear presenter, and a further £1.7 million from books, DVDs and newspaper columns. Clarkson and co-presenter James May were the first people to reach the North Magnetic Pole in a car also in 2007, chronicled in Top Gear: Polar Special.

He sustained minor injuries to his legs, back and hand in an intentional collision with a brick wall while making the 12th series of Top Gear in 2008.

In 2014, he received a £4.8 million dividend and an £8.4 million share buyout from BBC Worldwide, bringing his estimated income for the year to more than £14 million.

On 30 July 2015, it was announced that Clarkson, along with former Top Gear hosts Richard Hammond and James May would present a new show on Amazon Prime Video. The first season was made available worldwide in 2016. On 11 May 2016, Clarkson confirmed on his Twitter feed that the series would be titled The Grand Tour, and air from a different location each week.

On 9 March 2018, it was announced that Clarkson would host a revamped series of Who Wants to Be a Millionaire? on ITV. The show had previously been presented by Chris Tarrant.

Opinions and influence

Politics
Clarkson is in favour of personal freedom and against government regulation, stating that government should "build park benches and that is it. They should leave us alone." He has a particular contempt for the Health and Safety Executive. He often criticised the Labour governments of Tony Blair and Gordon Brown, especially what he calls the "ban" culture, frequently fixating on the bans on smoking and 2004 ban on fox hunting. In April 2013, Clarkson was among 2,000 invited guests to the funeral of Conservative Prime Minister Margaret Thatcher.

In an attempt to prove that the public furore over the 2007 UK child benefit data scandal was unjustified, he published his own bank account number and sort code, together with instructions on how to find out his address, in The Sun newspaper, expecting nobody to be able to remove money from his account. He later discovered that someone had set up a monthly direct debit for £500 to Diabetes UK.

Clarkson supported a Remain vote in the 2016 United Kingdom European Union membership referendum, three days before the referendum, he and fellow Top Gear/Grand Tour presenter James May posted a video stating their support. Clarkson did not support Brexit, stating that while the European Union has its problems, Britain would not have any influence over the EU, should it leave the Union. He envisions the European Union being turned into a US-like "United States of Europe", with one army, one currency, and one unifying set of values. In 2019, Clarkson said: "Europe has to punish us—they can't allow us to leave without being damaged because then everyone will want to go. We don't want to go if we're going to be damaged." In a January 2019 interview with LBC, Clarkson called Brexit voters "coffin-dodging idiots", though also criticized the younger voters, who overwhelmingly supported Remain, for their voting inactivity.

Clarkson's comments have both a large number of supporters and opponents. He often comments on the media-perceived social issues of the day, such as the fear of challenging adolescent youths, which he calls "hoodies". In 2007, Clarkson was cleared of allegations of assaulting a young person while visiting central Milton Keynes, after Thames Valley Police said that if anything, he had been the victim.

As a motoring journalist, he is frequently critical of government initiatives such as the London congestion charge or proposals on road charging. He is also frequently scornful of caravanners and cyclists. He has often singled out John Prescott, the former Transport Minister, and Stephen Joseph, the head of the public transport pressure group Transport 2000, for ridicule.

In September 2013, a tweet proposing that he might stand for election as an independent candidate in Doncaster North, the constituency of the then Labour leader of the opposition, Ed Miliband, was retweeted over 1,000 times – including by John Prescott.

Clarkson has been critical of the Special Relationship between the United States and the United Kingdom. He referred to the US as the "United States of Total Paranoia", commenting that one needs a permit to do everything except for purchasing weapons. In 2017, in response to the United States officially recognising Jerusalem as the capital of Israel, Clarkson advised Palestinians to recognize London as the capital of the United States.

In 2020, Clarkson stated that he usually votes for the Conservative Party, claiming not to be a natural Tory but "it just happens to be that every time it comes around and you weigh up which is going to provide you with a better life, the better country to live in, then it's usually the Conservatives"; he also mocked the policies of Tony Blair and Jeremy Corbyn, stating "only an idiot would vote for Corbyn." However, he also expressed support of incumbent Labour leader Keir Starmer and maintained that he was prepared to vote for Labour "if there's an election tomorrow" citing Boris Johnson's handling of the COVID-19 pandemic. Clarkson is also a personal friend of former Prime Minister and Conservative leader David Cameron.

In September 2022, he described socialists as "disgusting people".

Following the death death of Queen Elizabeth II, Clarkson shared a statement written by Boris Johnson on Twitter and captioned it "I was trying to think of something to say but Boris Johnson has said it all" and referred to the Queen as a "magnificent monarch."

Environment
Clarkson is critical of the green movement and environmentalism, including groups such as Greenpeace—he has called them "eco-mentalists" and "old trade unionists and CND lesbians". He also said that, although he "hate[s] the movement, [he] loves the destination" of environmentalism and believes that people should quietly strive to be more eco-friendly. He has been dismissive of windfarms and renewable energy and has spoken in support of hydrogen cars.

Clarkson rejects the scientific consensus on climate change, believing that anthropogenic greenhouse gas emissions do not affect the global climate. He has also expressed doubt that the effects of climate change are "a bad thing", saying in 2005 "let's just stop and think for a moment what the consequences might be. Switzerland loses its skiing resorts? The beach in Miami is washed away? North Carolina gets knocked over by a hurricane? Anything bothering you yet?" However, during a 2019 trip to Cambodia while filming The Grand Tour, Clarkson acknowledged the "graphic demonstration" of climate change impacts on the Mekong River and Tonlé Sap was "genuinely alarming", but still expressed doubt that it was driven by human activity. Cambodia was undergoing a severe drought during the show's filming. Clarkson is against climate activism, and has often made personal attacks against teenage activist Greta Thunberg, whom he has called "a spoilt brat".

Environmentalists have protested or heckled Clarkson on a number of occasions for his views, including at his honorary degree ceremony at Oxford Brookes University, where a protester threw a banana meringue pie in his face in 2006, and in 2009 when activist group Climate Rush dumped horse manure on his lawn. Clarkson's comments on Greta Thunberg were criticised by his own daughter.

Himself
Whilst Clarkson states such views as described above in his columns and in public appearances, his public persona does not necessarily represent his personal views, as he acknowledged whilst interviewing Alastair Campbell on Top Gear, saying "I don't believe what I write, any more than you [Campbell] believe what you say".

Clarkson has been described as a "skillful propagandist for the motoring lobby" by The Economist. With a forthright and sometimes deadpan delivery, Clarkson is said to thrive on the notoriety his public comments bring, and has risen to the level of the bête noire of the various groups who disagree with his views. On the Channel 4-organised viewer poll, for the 100 Worst Britons We Love to Hate programme, Clarkson polled in 66th place. By 2005, Clarkson was perceived by the press to have upset so many people and groups, The Independent put him on trial for various "crimes", declaring him guilty on most counts.

Media
Responses to Clarkson's comments are often directed personally, with derogatory comments about residents of Norfolk leading to some residents organising a "We hate Jeremy Clarkson" club. In The Guardian's 2007 'Media 100' list, which lists the top 100 most "powerful people in the [media] industry", based on cultural, economic and political influence in the UK, Clarkson was listed as a new entrant at 74th. Some critics even attribute Clarkson's actions and views as being influential enough to be responsible for the closure of Rover and the Luton manufacturing plant of Vauxhall. Clarkson's comments about Rover prompted workers to hang an "Anti-Clarkson Campaign" banner outside the defunct Longbridge plant in its last days.

The BBC often played down his comments as ultimately not having the weight they were ascribed. In 2007, they described Clarkson as "not a man given to considered opinion", and in response to an official complaint another BBC spokeswoman once said: "Jeremy's colourful comments are always entertaining, but they are his own comments and not those of the BBC. More often than not they are said with a twinkle in his eye."

On his chat show, Clarkson, he caused upset to the Welsh by placing a 3D plastic map of Wales into a microwave oven and switching it on. He later defended this by saying, "I put Wales in there because Scotland wouldn't fit."

Recognition
In 2005, Clarkson received an honorary Doctor of Engineering degree from the Oxford Brookes University. His views on the environment precipitated a small demonstration at the award ceremony for his honorary degree, when Clarkson was pied by road protester Rebecca Lush. Clarkson took this incident in good humour, responding "good shot" and subsequently referring to Lush as "Banana girl".

In 2008, an internet petition was posted on the Prime Minister's Number 10 website to "Make Jeremy Clarkson Prime Minister". By the time it closed, it had attracted 49,446 signatures. An opposing petition posted on the same site set to "Never, Ever Make Jeremy Clarkson Prime Minister" attracted 87 signatures. Clarkson later commented he would be a rubbish Prime Minister as he is always contradicting himself in his columns. In the official response to the petition, Number 10 agreed with Clarkson's comments.

In response to the reactions he gets, Clarkson has stated "I enjoy this back and forth, it makes the world go round but it is just opinion." On the opinion that his views are influential enough to topple car companies, he has argued that he has proof that he has had no influence. "When I said that the Ford Orion was the worst car ever it went on to become a best-selling car."

Clarkson was ranked 49th on Motor Trend Magazine's Power List for 2011, its list of the fifty most influential figures in the automotive industry.

Other interests

Military interests
Clarkson has a keen interest in the British Armed Forces and several of his DVDs and television shows have featured a military theme, such as flying in military jets or several Clarkson-focused Top Gear spots having a military theme such as Clarkson escaping a Challenger 2 tank in a Range Rover, a Lotus Exige evading missile lock from an Apache attack helicopter, a platoon of Irish Guardsmen shooting at a Porsche Boxster and Mercedes-Benz SLK, or using a Ford Fiesta as a Royal Marine landing craft. In October 2005, Clarkson visited British troops in Baghdad.

In 2003, Clarkson presented The Victoria Cross: For Valour, looking at recipients of the Victoria Cross, in particular focusing on his father-in-law, Robert Henry Cain, who received a VC for actions during the Battle of Arnhem in World War II.

In 2007, Clarkson wrote and presented Jeremy Clarkson: Greatest Raid of All Time, a documentary about the World War II Operation Chariot, a 1942 Commando raid on the docks of Saint-Nazaire in occupied France. At the end of 2007, Clarkson became a patron of Help for Heroes, a charity aiming to raise money to provide better facilities to wounded British servicemen. His effort led to the 2007 Christmas appeal in The Sunday Times supporting Help for Heroes.

Engineering interests
Clarkson is passionate about engineering, especially pioneering work. In Inventions That Changed the World Clarkson showcased the invention of the gun, computer, jet engine, telephone and television. He has previously criticised the engineering feats of the 20th century as merely improvements on the truly innovative inventions of the Industrial Revolution. He cites the lack of any source of alternative power for cars, other than by "small explosions". In Great Britons, as part of a public poll to find the greatest historical Briton, Clarkson was the chief supporter for Isambard Kingdom Brunel, a prominent engineer during the Industrial Revolution credited with numerous innovations. Despite this, he also has a passion for many modern examples of engineering. In Speed and Extreme Machines, Clarkson rides and showcases numerous vehicles and machinery. Clarkson was awarded an honorary degree from Brunel University on 12 September 2003, partly because of his work in popularising engineering, and partly because of his advocacy of Brunel.

In his book I Know You Got Soul, he describes many machines that he believes possess a soul. He cited the Concorde crash as his inspiration, feeling a sadness for the demise of the machine as well as the passengers. Clarkson was a passenger on the last BA Concorde flight, on 24 October 2003. Paraphrasing Neil Armstrong he described the retirement of the fleet as "This is one small step for a man, but one huge leap backwards for mankind".

He briefly acquired an English Electric Lightning F1A jet fighter XM172 former RAF Coltishall gate guard, which was installed in the front garden of his country home. The Lightning was subsequently removed on the orders of the local council, which "wouldn't believe my claim that it was a leaf blower", according to Clarkson on a Tiscali Motoring webchat. The whole affair was set up for his programme Speed, and the Lightning was returned to serving as gate guardian at Wycombe Air Park (formerly RAF Booker). Due to deteriorating condition and threat of scrapping, XM172 was then purchased by Neil Airey and transported to Spark Bridge, Cumbria, for restoration. The aircraft is now in good condition and viewable by appointment.

In a Top Gear episode, Clarkson drove the Bugatti Veyron in a race across Europe against a Cessna 182 piloted by co-presenter James May. The Veyron was an £850,000 technology demonstrator project built by Volkswagen to become the fastest production car, but a practical road car at the same time. In building such an ambitious machine, Clarkson described the project as "a triumph for lunacy over common sense, a triumph for man over nature and a triumph for Volkswagen over absolutely every other car maker in the world." After winning the race, Clarkson announced that "It's quite a hollow victory really, because I've got to go for the rest of my life knowing that I'll never own that car. I'll never experience that power again."

Cars

Ownership

Cars/vehicles Clarkson currently owns:
 Range Rover Autobiography V8
 Mercedes-Benz 600 Grosser LWB (featured in Top Gear Series 11 Episode 5, compared against James May's Rolls-Royce Corniche)
 Range Rover TDV8 Vogue SE
 Jeep Wrangler (From The Grand Tour, Series 3 – "Colombia Special")
 Alfa Romeo Alfetta GTV6 (From The Grand Tour, Series 3 – "Well Aged Scotch")
 Range Rover Vogue SE
 Bentley Flying Spur
"The Excellent" (Land Rover Discovery and Mercedes SL Combination from the Grand Tour Series 1, Episode 9)
Lamborghini Trattori R8 270 DCR (A tractor for his farm)
Lincoln Continental Mark V (From The Grand Tour, Series 4 – "Lochdown")
Mini
Cars Clarkson has owned:

 Ford Cortina
 Volkswagen Scirocco 1
 Volkswagen Scirocco 2
 Honda CR-X
 BMW 3.0L CSL
 BMW Z1
 Ford Escort RS Cosworth
 Ferrari F355
 Toyota Land Cruiser
 Jaguar XJR
 Mercedes-Benz SL55 AMG
 Volvo XC90
 Lotus Elise 111S
 Ford GT
 Ford Focus
 Mercedes-Benz SLK55 AMG
 Lamborghini Gallardo Spyder
 Aston Martin V8 Vantage
 Mercedes CLK63 AMG Black
 Mercedes-Benz CL 600
 Volkswagen Golf GTI
 Modified Bentley Continental GT V8 (from The Grand Tour "A Massive Hunt" in Series 4)

Clarkson wanted to purchase the Ford GT after admiring its inspiration, the Ford GT40 race cars of the 1960s. Clarkson was able to secure a place on the shortlist for the few cars that would be imported to Britain to official customers, only through knowing Ford's head of PR through a previous job. After waiting years and facing an increased price, he found many technical problems with the car. After "the most miserable month's motoring possible," he returned it to Ford for a full refund. After a short period, including asking Top Gear fans for advice over the Internet, he bought back his GT. He called it "the most unreliable car ever made", because he was never able to complete a return journey with it.

In 2006, Clarkson ordered a Gallardo Spyder and sold the Ford GT to make way for it. In August 2008, he sold the Gallardo because "idiots in Peugeots kept trying to race [him] in it". In October, he announced that he had sold his Volvo XC90. In January 2009, in a review of the car printed in The Times, he wrote: "I’ve just bought my third Volvo XC90 in a row and the simple fact is this: it takes six children to school in the morning."

Likes

Clarkson has spoken highly of the Czech-made Škoda Yeti, calling it possibly the best car in the world, and used 20 minutes of a Top Gear episode putting the Yeti through a number of challenges to support his point. Clarkson called the Brera, Alfa's latest sports car, "Cameron Diaz on wheels". Clarkson has expressed fondness for late-model V8 Holdens, available in the UK rebadged as Vauxhalls. Of the Monaro he said, "It's like they had a picture of me on their desk and said [Australian accent] 'Let's build that bloke a car!'" and "I can't believe it... I've fallen in love... with a Vauxhall!" Clarkson suffered two slipped discs that he attributed to driving the Monaro, which he described as being "back-breakingly marvellous". Clarkson considers the Lexus LFA as the best car he has ever driven.

During Top Gear'''s Patagonia Special, Clarkson said that the Porsche 928 was a car that was close to his heart; Clarkson was given the car to test for the series in 1994 and used it to unexpectedly drive from London to Sheffield to visit his dying father in hospital. Clarkson said that had he had not driven the Porsche 928 (which was fast enough where a chicken he had cooked was "still warm" by the time he arrived in Sheffield), he "wouldn't have had the opportunity to say goodbye to [his] dad".

Dislikes

Clarkson dislikes the British car brand Rover, the last major British owned and built car manufacturer. This view stretched back to the company's time as part of British Leyland. Describing the history of the company up to its last flagship model, the Rover 75, he paraphrased Winston Churchill and stated "Never in the field of human endeavour has so much been done, so badly, by so many," citing issues with the rack and pinion steering system. In the latter years of the company, Clarkson blamed the "uncool" brand image as being more of a hindrance to sales than any faults with the cars. On its demise, Clarkson stated "I cannot even get teary and emotional about the demise of the company itself – though I do feel sorry for the workforce." Clarkson has also expressed hatred for the Toyota Prius.

Clarkson has also criticised Vauxhalls and has described Vauxhall's parent company, General Motors, as a "pensions and healthcare" company which sees the "car making side of the business as an expensive loss-making nuisance". Clarkson has expressed particular disdain for the Vauxhall Vectra, describing it as:

After a Top Gear piece by Clarkson for its launch in 1995, described by The Independent as "not doing [GM] any favours", Vauxhall complained to the BBC and announced, "We can take criticism but this piece was totally unbalanced."

Controversies
Clarkson's comments and actions have sometimes resulted in complaints from viewers, car companies, and national governments.

Activities on Top Gear

In 2004, the BBC apologised unreservedly and paid £250 in compensation to a Somerset parish council, after Clarkson damaged a 30-year-old horse-chestnut tree by driving into it to test the strength of a Toyota Hilux. In December 2006, the BBC complaints department upheld the complaint of four Top Gear viewers that Clarkson had used the phrase "ginger beer" (rhyming slang for "queer") in a derogatory manner, when Clarkson picked up on and agreed with an audience member's description of the Daihatsu Copen as being a bit "gay". The Top Gear: Polar Special was criticised by the BBC Trust for glamorising drunk driving in a scene depicting Clarkson and James May consuming alcohol whilst Clarkson says to camera, "And please do not write to us about drinking and driving, because I am not driving, I am sailing,” thereby implying that they were driving on frozen international waters. Despite the show’s producers claiming that the incident occurred outside the jurisdiction of any drunk-driving laws, the BBC Trust maintained that the scene “was not editorially justified.”

In a later incident during a Top Gear episode broadcast on 13 November 2005, Clarkson, while talking about a Mini design that might be "quintessentially German", made a mock Nazi salute, and made references to the Hitler regime and the German invasion of Poland by suggesting the GPS "only goes to Poland".

In November 2008, Clarkson attracted over 500 complaints to the BBC when he joked about lorry drivers murdering prostitutes.Staff writer (6 November 2008). "MP calls for Clarkson to lose job", BBC News Online. Retrieved 6 November 2008. The BBC stated the comment was a comic rebuttal of a common misconception about lorry drivers and was within the viewer's expectation of Clarkson's Top Gear persona. Chris Mole, the Member of Parliament for Ipswich, where five prostitutes were murdered in 2006, wrote a "strongly worded" letter to BBC Director-General Mark Thompson, demanding that Clarkson be sacked. Clarkson dismissed Mole's comments in his Sunday Times column the following weekend, writing, "There are more important things to worry about than what some balding and irrelevant middle-aged man might have said on a crappy BBC2 motoring show." Andrew Tinkler, chief executive of the Eddie Stobart Group, a major trucking company, stated that "They were just having a laugh. It's the 21st century, let's get our sense of humour in line."

In July 2009, Clarkson was reported to have called then British Prime Minister Gordon Brown "a silly cunt" during a warm-up while recording a Top Gear show. Although several newspapers reported that he had subsequently argued with BBC Two controller Janice Hadlow, who was present at the recording, the BBC denied that he had been given a "dressing down". John Whittingdale, Conservative chair of the Culture Select Committee remarked: "Many people will find that offensive, many people will find that word in particular very offensive [...] I am surprised he felt it appropriate to use it."

In July 2010, Clarkson reportedly angered gay rights campaigners after he made a remark on Top Gear that did not get aired on 4 July episode. But guest Alastair Campbell wrote about it on Twitter. Clarkson said: "I demand the right not to be bummed". The BBC later said that they cut this remark out as they "edited down" the interview as it was too long to fit into the show.
In an episode aired after the watershed on 1 August 2010, Clarkson described a Ferrari F430 as "special needs". He said the car owned by co-presenter James May looked "like a simpleton". Media regulator Ofcom investigated after receiving two complaints, and found that the comments "were capable of causing offence" but did not censure the BBC.

On 12 January 2012, the Indian High Commission lodged a formal complaint with the BBC over the "tasteless" antics of Clarkson's Top Gear Christmas special where he mocked India's culture and people. During the 90-minute special, which was aired twice over the Christmas break, Clarkson made a string of jokes about Indian food, clothes, toilets, trains and history.
On an episode of Top Gear broadcast on 5 February 2012, Clarkson compared a Japanese car/camper van to a person with a growth on their face. A major UK charity that supports people with facial disfigurements, Changing Faces, complained to the BBC and Ofcom after Clarkson's remarks.

In an unused take for a Top Gear feature recorded in early 2012, Clarkson is alleged to have mumbled the ethnic slur "nigger" when repeating the children's rhyme Eeny, meeny, miny, moe. The clip later surfaced on the website of the Daily Mirror tabloid at the beginning of May 2014. In the take, Clarkson attempts to mumble the sentence so as to obscure the word, but admitted that upon a close listening, the word could still be heard. Clarkson apologised for his efforts not being "quite good enough" to ensure the footage was not used. It was reported on 3 May, that the BBC had given Clarkson a final warning, with the presenter accepting that he would be sacked if he made another offensive remark.

Near the end of the Top Gear: Burma Special, which aired March 2014, Clarkson and Hammond were seen admiring a wooden bridge, which they had built during the episode. Clarkson is quoted as saying "That is a proud moment, but there's a slope on it" as a native crosses the bridge, "slope" being a pejorative for Asians. Top Gear Executive Producer Andy Wilman responded: "When we used the word slope in the recent Top Gear Burma Special it was a light-hearted word play joke referencing both the build quality of the bridge and the local Asian man who was crossing it. We were not aware at the time, and it has subsequently been brought to our attention, that the word slope is considered by some to be offensive."

In October 2014, Clarkson attracted controversy when filming the Top Gear: Patagonia Special after driving a Porsche 928 in Argentina with the licence plate H982 FKL, allegedly referring to the 1982 Falklands War. Also, during the broadcast, Clarkson was seen referring to the controversy that had risen after the Burma Special; when inspecting a bridge, which he and his colleagues had built during the episode, he was quoted as saying "That is a proud moment, Hammond, but... is it straight?" With Hammond replying "Yes."

Activities outside Top Gear
In October 1998, Hyundai complained to the BBC about what they described as "bigoted and racist" comments he made at the Birmingham Motor Show, where he was reported as saying that the people working on the Hyundai stand had "eaten a dog" and that the designer of the Hyundai XG had probably eaten a spaniel for his lunch. Clarkson also allegedly referred to those working on the BMW stand as "Nazis", although BMW said they would not be complaining.

In March 2004, at the British Press Awards, he swore at Piers Morgan and punched him before being restrained by security; Morgan says it left him with a scar above his left eyebrow.

In April 2007, Clarkson was criticised in the Malaysian parliament for having described one of their cars, the Perodua Kelisa, as the worst in the world, adding that "its name was like a disease and [suggesting] it was built in jungles by people who wear leaves for shoes". A Malaysian government minister countered, pointing out that no complaints had been received from UK customers who had bought the car.

In February 2009, while in Australia, Clarkson made disparaging remarks aimed at the British Prime Minister Gordon Brown, calling him a "one-eyed Scottish idiot", and accused him of lying. These comments were widely condemned by the Royal National Institute of Blind People and also Scottish politicians, who requested that he should be taken off air. He subsequently apologised for referencing Brown's monocular blindness, but said: "I haven't apologised for calling him an idiot."

His column for The Sun newspaper on 4 September 2011 drew angry remarks in response to Clarkson's call to abolish the Welsh language: "I think we are fast approaching the time when the United Nations should start to think seriously about abolishing other languages. What's the point of Welsh, for example? All it does is provide a silly maypole around which a bunch of hotheads can get all nationalistic."

On 30 November 2011, while being interviewed on the BBC's The One Show, Clarkson commented on the UK's public sector strike that day, lauding the capital's empty roads. After mentioning the BBC's need for balance, he said, "I would take them outside and execute them in front of their families." The programme later apologised for his remarks, with further apologies issued by Clarkson and the BBC. These remarks had attracted 21,335 complaints to the BBC within 36 hours; the BBC also received 314 messages of support for Clarkson.

Clarkson was criticised by the mental health charity Mind for his 3 December 2011 column for The Sun, in which he described those who jump in front of trains as "Johnny Suicide" and argues that following a death, trains should carry on their journeys as soon as possible. He adds: "The train cannot be removed nor the line reopened until all of the victim's body has been recovered. And sometimes the head can be half a mile away from the feet." ... "Change the driver, pick up the big bits of what's left of the victim, get the train moving as quickly as possible and let foxy woxy and the birds nibble away at the smaller, gooey parts that are far away or hard to find."

Road safety
Clarkson often discusses high speed driving on public roads, criticising road safety campaigns involving cameras and speed bumps. In 2002, a Welsh Assembly Member Alun Pugh wrote to BBC Director-General Greg Dyke to complain about Clarkson's comments that he believed encouraged people to use Welsh roads as a high-speed test track. A BBC spokesman said that suggestions Clarkson had encouraged speeding were "nonsense". Clarkson has also made similar comments about driving in Lincolnshire. In a November 2005 Times article, Clarkson wrote on the Bugatti Veyron, "On a recent drive across Europe I desperately wanted to reach the top speed but I ran out of road when the needle hit 240 mph," and "From the wheel of a Veyron, France is the size of a small coconut. I cannot tell you how fast I crossed it the other day. Because you simply wouldn't believe me."

In 2007, solicitor Nick Freeman represented Clarkson against a charge of driving at 86 mph in a 50 mph zone on the A40 road in London, defeating it on the basis that the driver of the car loaned to Clarkson from Alfa Romeo could not be ascertained. In 2008, Clarkson claimed in a talk at the Hay Festival to have been given a speeding ticket for driving at 186 mph on the A1203 Limehouse Link road in London.

Dismissal from Top Gear

In March 2015, Clarkson was suspended by the BBC from Top Gear following a "fracas" with one of the show's producers, Oisin Tymon. It emerged that Clarkson had been involved in a dispute over catering while filming on location in Hawes, North Yorkshire. Clarkson had been offered soup and a cold meat platter, instead of the steak he wanted, because the hotel chef had gone home.

The BBC announced that the next episode of the show would not be broadcast on 15 March. It was later announced through the BBC's website that the network would be likely to drop the remaining two episodes of the series as well in the wake of the incident, which involved Clarkson punching producer Oisin Tymon, who was later treated in hospital. Tymon also said that Clarkson had called him a "lazy Irish cunt". Clarkson's contract with the BBC expired at the end of March, and a previously proposed three-year renewal was withdrawn.

A Change.org petition, aiming to reverse the BBC decision, was started on 10 March by blogger Guido Fawkes. The petition reached its target 1,000,000 signatures by the afternoon of 20 March, and was delivered to the BBC in an artillery vehicle by a man dressed as Top Gear test driver The Stig, with Fawkes as spokesman. The hosting website described the petition as the fastest-growing campaign in its history.

On 19 March 2015, at a charity auction at the Roundhouse in Camden, north London, Clarkson launched into a verbal tirade against BBC studio bosses related to his suspension from the programme, saying "The BBC have fucked themselves." He later stated that this was "meant in jest".

On 25 March 2015, the BBC released an official statement confirming that, as a result of the actions which led to his suspension, they would not be renewing his contract with the show. Following the statement, North Yorkshire Police requested to view the report and stated that "action will be taken by North Yorkshire police where necessary". However, Tymon informed the police that he did not wish to press charges against Clarkson, and Clarkson urged fans of the show to stop trolling Tymon on social media, as what happened was not his fault. British police investigated death threats made against BBC Director-General Tony Hall over Clarkson's firing. Less than 24 hours after his dismissal, Clarkson was approached by Zvezda, a Russian state broadcaster, to present a motoring programme.

In his Sunday Times column on 19 April, Clarkson said that two days before he hit Tymon, he had been told by his doctor that a lump he had could be cancer of the tongue. Testing later confirmed that it was not cancerous. In the same column, he stated that he had initially considered retiring from television following his dismissal, but was now planning a new motoring programme.

In November 2015, Tymon sued Clarkson and the BBC for racial discrimination over the verbal abuse he received in the March incident. The following February, Clarkson formally apologised to Tymon and settled the racial discrimination and personal injury claim for £100,000.

 The Sun newspaper column on the Duchess of Sussex 
In December 2022, he was criticised for one of his columns in The Sun on Meghan, Duchess of Sussex, which was deemed misogynistic by critics as he stated:
 
He later said it was a reference to a scene from the television series Game of Thrones. He had used the same reference in an article published in The Sun in December 2018 to defend Meghan:
 In his other columns, Clarkson criticised Meghan for her "simpering victimhood", called her a "silly little cable TV actress", and stated that her climate change pleas make him want to "shoot a polar bear in the middle of its face." The Independent Press Standards Organisation (IPSO) said it had received more than 25,100 complaints about the piece, making it the article with the most number of complaints attached to it since IPSO's establishment in 2014. The number is also more than the total number of complaints made to IPSO in 2021, which was 14,355.

On 19 December 2022, The Suns website published a statement in response to the criticism: "In light of Jeremy Clarkson's tweet he has asked us to take last week's column down." In light of the controversy, Edward Faulks, the chair of IPSO, declined a private dinner invitation by Rupert Murdoch, who owns The Sun. The Scottish first minister, Nicola Sturgeon, whose name was also mentioned in the column, described Clarkson's comments as "deeply misogynist and just downright awful and horrible" and warned that "words have consequences". The prime minister, Rishi Sunak, responded to the controversy by emphasising that "language matters". In a letter to ITV chief executive Carolyn McCall, SNP MP John Nicolson called on the organisation to sack Clarkson.

On 20 December 2022, Conservative MP Caroline Nokes wrote to The Suns editor, Victoria Newton, calling for "action [to be] taken" against Clarkson and for an "unreserved apology". The letter was signed by more than 60 cross-party MPs. On 21 December, Kevin Lygo, the managing director of ITV, stated at a Broadcasting Press Guild event that Clarkson would remain host of Who Wants to Be a Millionaire? "at the moment" as ITV had "no control" over what he said in The Sun newspaper column, but added that what he wrote "was awful" and "he should apologise" for his comments. On the same day the head of the Metropolitan Police Sir Mark Rowley stated Clarkson would not face criminal proceedings for his actions as it was not the job of officers to "police people's ethics" and the police could generally get involved when "things are said that are intended or likely to stir up or incite violence".

Peter Herbert, the chair of the Society of Black Lawyers, wrote to the Metropolitan Police requesting an investigation under the Public Order Act 1986 as he believed the column promoted racial hatred. The letter was co-signed by the Society of Black Lawyers, Operation Black Vote and Bandung Africa, as well as Lee Jasper, Viv Ahmun, Bell Ribeiro-Addy, and Claudia Webbe. A spokesperson for the Metropolitan Police said "The allegations have been assessed, no offences have been identified, and no further action will be taken." On 11 January 2023, culture secretary Michelle Donelan described Clarkson's comments as "outrageous" but not "illegal" and said that she "wouldn't have said what he said and I don't align myself with the comments that he made" but "I defend his right to be able to say what he wants" because "that's the nature of free speech – of course, that shouldn't stray into illegal content or go in certain directions."

On 19 December Clarkson, stated he was "horrified to have caused so much hurt" over his comments, which were also criticised by his daughter Emily. On 23 December, The Sun issued an apology, stating "columnists' opinions are their own" but they "regret the publication of this article" and are "sincerely sorry". On the following day, a spokesperson for the Duke and Duchess of Sussex described the apology as "nothing more than a PR stunt" and added that the publication had not contacted Meghan to personally apologise which "shows their intent". In an Instagram post on 16 January 2023, Clarkson said that he had emailed the Duke and Duchess on Christmas Day 2022 to apologise, saying that his language had been "disgraceful" and he was "profoundly sorry". A spokesperson for the couple said Clarkson wrote solely to the Duke and the article was not an isolated incident considering "his long-standing pattern of writing articles that spread hate rhetoric, dangerous conspiracy theories and misogyny."

In the fall out from the comments, it was reported that Amazon was likely ending its relationship with Clarkson. He is the host of Clarkson's Farm and The Grand Tour for the streaming service, and both of those series are now expected to end after their final episodes air and will not be renewed. In February 2023, IPSO announced that it was launching an investigation about the article, specifically taking forward two groups of complaints, from the Fawcett Society and the Wilde Foundation, which claimed "they were affected by breaches in accuracy, harassment and discrimination."

Personal life
Clarkson married Alex Hall in 1989, but she left him for one of his friends after six months. In May 1993, he married his manager, Frances Cain, daughter of VC recipient Robert Henry Cain, in Fulham. The couple lived in Chipping Norton, in the Cotswolds, with their three children. Clarkson has been described as a member of the Chipping Norton set. Known for buying him car-related gifts, for Christmas 2007 Clarkson's second wife bought him a Mercedes-Benz 600. Clarkson and Cain divorced in 2014.

Clarkson was involved in a protracted legal dispute about access to a "permissive path" across the grounds of his second home, a converted lighthouse, on the Isle of Man between 2005 and 2010, after reports that dogs had attacked and killed sheep on the property. Clarkson and his wife had claimed that four sheep were deliberately killed after being chased into the sea by a dog let off its lead. He lost the dispute after the Isle of Man government held a public inquiry, and he was told to re-open the footpath. The decision was affirmed by the Isle of Man High Court.

Clarkson is a fan of the progressive rock band Genesis and attended the band's reunion concert at Twickenham Stadium in 2007. He also provided sleeve notes for the reissue of the album Selling England by the Pound as part of the Genesis 1970–1975 box set.

In September 2010, Clarkson was granted a privacy injunction against his first wife to prevent her from publishing claims that their sexual relationship continued after his second marriage (see AMM v HXW). He voluntarily lifted the injunction in October 2011, commenting that: "Injunctions don't work. You take out an injunction against somebody or some organisation and immediately news of that injunction and the people involved and the story behind the injunction is in a legal-free world on Twitter and the Internet. It's pointless."

Since 2017, Clarkson has been in a relationship with Irish-born former actress and screenplay writer Lisa Hogan, who features in his Amazon Prime series Clarkson's Farm.

On 4 August 2017, he was admitted to hospital after falling ill with pneumonia while on a family holiday in Majorca, Spain, and was being treated in a hospital there. He subsequently said he could "breathe out harder and for longer than a non-smoking 40-year-old" and had 96 percent capacity for a person his age. "In short, getting on for three-quarters of a million fags have not harmed me in any way. I have quite literally defied medical science".

For his 60th birthday in 2020, Clarkson purchased a Bentley Flying Spur as a present to himself.

In January 2021, Clarkson said he had tested positive for COVID-19 during December 2020 after displaying symptoms.

Filmography
Television

Music videos

Bibliography

 Two books containing the best columns from previous publications, entitled "The Collected Thoughts of Clarkson" and "Never Played Golf", were issued by Top Gear magazine, in 2003 and 2004 respectively.

Britcar 24 Hour results

References

Further reading
 Jeremy Clarkson's Motorworld (1996), 
 Clarkson on Cars: Writings and Rantings of the BBC's Top Motoring Correspondent (1996), 
 Clarkson's Hot 100 (1997), 
 Jeremy Clarkson's Planet Dagenham: Drivestyles of the Rich and Famous (1998), 
 Born to Be Riled: The Collected Writings of Jeremy Clarkson (1999) (re-published 2007), 
 Jeremy Clarkson's Ultimate Ferrari (2001), 
 The World According To Clarkson (2004), 
 Clarkson on Cars (2004), 
 I Know You Got Soul (2004), 
 Motorworld (2004), 
 The World According to Clarkson 2: And Another Thing...'' (2006),

External links

Archive of Clarkson's Sunday Times columns

1960 births
Living people
British motoring journalists
20th-century English non-fiction writers
21st-century English writers
Jeremy Clarkson's firing from Top Gear
English columnists
English male journalists
English male non-fiction writers
English television presenters
English game show hosts
English farmers
People educated at Hill House School, South Yorkshire
People educated at Repton School
People from Doncaster
The Sun (United Kingdom) people
The Sunday Times people
Top Gear people
Sportspeople from Yorkshire
Robot Wars (TV series) presenters
People from Chipping Norton
Who Wants to Be a Millionaire?
Britcar 24-hour drivers